Zygmunt Hübner (23 March 1930 – 12 January 1989) was a Polish actor, stage director, and director of the National Old Theatre in Kraków (1963-69). He appeared in more than 20 films between 1958 and 1988.

Selected filmography
 Samson (1961)
 Westerplatte (1967)

References

External links

 

1930 births
1989 deaths
Polish male film actors
Male actors from Warsaw
Polish male stage actors
Recipients of the Order of Polonia Restituta
20th-century Polish male actors